Aaron O'Sullivan (born 15 December 1999) is an Irish rugby union player, currently playing for Pro14 and European Rugby Champions Cup side Leinster. His preferred position is wing.

Rugby union
O'Sullivan previously played association football, represented the academies of both Southampton and Reading. After committing to rugby, O'Sullivan played for Wasps in the Anglo-Welsh cup. He then committed to the Leinster academy, and has yet to debut for Leinster. He has represented the Ireland national rugby sevens team.

References

External links
itsrugby.co.uk Profile

1999 births
Living people
Irish rugby union players
Leinster Rugby players
Rugby union wings
Rugby union players from Basingstoke